Artur Sérgio Batista de Souza (born 5 August 1994), known simply as Artur, is a Brazilian footballer who plays as a left-back for Ponte Preta.

Career
Born in Abel Figueiredo, Pará, Artur began his career with Sport Club Internacional in Rio Grande do Sul. He had his first senior call-up on 16 October 2013, remaining an unused substitute in a goalless Campeonato Brasileiro Série A draw at Santos FC, and made eight more appearances on the bench that season.

On 5 June 2015, he made his professional debut, starting in a 1–1 draw at Sociedade Esportiva Palmeiras in the year's national championship; he totalled 13 appearances that season, 9 as a starter.

Artur scored his first goal on 11 February 2016, to win a home match 2–1 against Esporte Clube Passo Fundo in the year's Campeonato Gaúcho.

On 16 August 2020, Artur signed a contract with Keşla FK until the end of the 2020–21 season. On 30 November 2020, Keşla announced the departure of Artur by mutual consent.

References

External links

Living people
1994 births
Brazilian footballers
Brazilian expatriate footballers
Sportspeople from Pará
Association football defenders
Campeonato Brasileiro Série A players
Campeonato Brasileiro Série B players
Sport Club Internacional players
Associação Atlética Ponte Preta players
Grêmio Esportivo Brasil players
FC Vorskla Poltava players
Shamakhi FK players
Ukrainian Premier League players
Brazilian expatriate sportspeople in Ukraine
Expatriate footballers in Ukraine
Azerbaijan Premier League players
Expatriate footballers in Azerbaijan
Brazilian expatriate sportspeople in Azerbaijan